Norman Kennedy was a trade unionist and politician in Ireland.

Kennedy was a prominent member of the Amalgamated Transport and General Workers' Union.  He served as President of the Irish Trades Union Congress in 1957.  He worked closely with James Larkin, Jr and John Conroy to complete its reunification with the Congress of Irish Unions, and became President of the united organisation, the Irish Congress of Trade Unions, in 1961.  He also served on the Northern Ireland Economic Council.

Kennedy served as a Northern Ireland Labour Party member of the Senate of Northern Ireland from 1965 until its proguation in 1972.  From 1970 to 1971, he served as a Deputy Speaker.  He then withdrew from politics and trade unionism, and led the consortium which established Downtown Radio, Northern Ireland's first commercial radio station.

References

Year of birth missing
Year of death missing
Irish trade unionists
Members of the Senate of Northern Ireland 1965–1969
Members of the Senate of Northern Ireland 1969–1973
Northern Ireland Labour Party members of the Senate of Northern Ireland
Presidents of the Irish Congress of Trade Unions
Place of birth missing